Christopher Hülsbeck (born 2 March 1968), known internationally as Chris Huelsbeck, is a German video game music composer. He gained popularity for his work on game soundtracks for The Great Giana Sisters and the Turrican series.

Career 

Huelsbeck's music career started at age 17, when he entered a music competition in the German 64'er magazine, taking first prize with his composition "Shades". He took a job in music production with the company Rainbow Arts.

In 1986, Huelsbeck released the SoundMonitor program for Commodore 64 computer. The program was released as a type-in listing in the German computer magazine 64'er. This program, featuring the idea of notation data rolling from down to up, is assumed to have a significant influence on Karsten Obarski's Ultimate Soundtracker (1987) which was a starting point for the still continuing tradition of tracker music programs.

Huelsbeck has written soundtracks for more than 70 titles, the latest being Giana Sisters: Twisted Dreams. Many of his scores for the Commodore 64 are regarded as classics among enthusiasts today, most notably The Great Giana Sisters. He is best known for the soundtracks to the Turrican series of games.

He also created a music replay routine for the Amiga called TFMX — "The Final Musicsystem eXtended", which features more musically-oriented features than rival Soundtracker, such as logarithmic pitch-bends, sound macros and individual tempos for each track.

Orchestra performances 
His music from Apidya, Turrican II, Turrican 3 and The Great Giana Sisters was performed live at the Symphonic Game Music Concert series in Leipzig, Germany between 2003 and 2007, conducted by Andy Brick. Huelsbeck's music from Apidya was thus part of the first game concert outside Japan in 2003.

On 23 August 2008, his music was performed at Symphonic Shades, a concert devoted exclusively to his work. For the first time ever in Europe, an orchestral concert was dedicated to a game composer and broadcast live on the radio. The WDR Radio Orchestra and a choir performed classics such as The Great Giana Sisters, Turrican, R-Type and others in Cologne, Germany under the direction of Arnie Roth. On 19 March 2009, the concert Sinfonia Drammatica at the Konserthuset in Stockholm, Sweden was announced, with Arnie Roth conducting the Royal Stockholm Philharmonic Orchestra. The event took place on 4 August 2009 and combined performances of Huelsbeck's Symphonic Shades with excerpts from Drammatica by Yoko Shimomura.

Discography
 1991 Shades
 1992 To be on Top
 1992 Apidya
 1993 Turrican Soundtrack
 1994 Native Vision - Easy life (single)
 1994 Rainbows
 1995 Super Turrican 2
 1995 Sound Factory
 1997 Tunnel B1 Soundtrack
 1997 Extreme Assault soundtrack
 1998 Peanuts feat. Doc. Schneider - Leben betrügt (single)
 2000 Bridge from the past to the future (released at MP3.com)
 2000 Collage (released at MP3.com)
 2000 Merregnon Soundtrack, Volume 1
 2001 Chris Hülsbeck in the Mix (released by ZYX Music)
 2004 Merregnon Soundtrack, Volume 2 (English and Japanese edition)
 2007 Number Nine
 2008 Symphonic Shades
 2013 Turrican Soundtrack Anthology (Volumes 1-4)
 2015 The Piano Collection
 2017 25 Years - Turrican II The Orchestral Album by Chris Huelsbeck
 2017 Turrican - Orchestral Selections

Games
 Active Soccer (iOS, PC, MacOS)
 Adrift in a Cobalt Eternity (PC)
 The Adventures of Quik & Silva (Amiga, Atari ST)
 Apidya (Amiga)
 Apprentice (Amiga)
 Bad Cat (C64)
 Battle Isle (Amiga, PC) (main title music)
 The Baby of Can Guru (C64)
 Bubsy: The Woolies Strike Back (PC, PS4)
 Bundesliga Manager: Hattrick (Amiga, PC)
 Caribbean Disaster (Amiga, PC)
 The Carl Lewis Challenge (Amiga, Atari ST, PC)
 Circus Attractions (Amiga)
 Cristoph Kolumbus (PC)
 Danger Freak (Amiga, C64)
 Denny (Amiga) (unreleased)
 Down at the trolls (C64)
 Doctor Who: Legacy (Android, Browser, iOS)
 Dulcedo Cogitationis (C64)
 Eddy & Co: Das Eismann-Spiel (PC)
 Extreme Assault (PC)
 Gem'X (Amiga, Atari ST, C64)
 Super Gem'X (Amiga, PC) (unreleased)
 GeoDrop (iOS)
 Grand Monster Slam (Amiga)
 The Great Giana Sisters (C64)
 Giana Sisters: Twisted Dreams (PC, PS3, PS4, X360, XBOne, WiiU, Switch)
 Giana Sisters: Twisted Dreams - Rise of the Owlverlord (iOS, PC, PS3, PS4, X360, XBOne, WiiU, Switch)
 Hard 'n' Heavy (C64)
 Hexuma (Amiga)
 Hollywood Poker Pro (Amiga, C64)
 Jim Power in Mutant Planet (Amiga, Atari ST, PCE CD)
 Jim Power: The Lost Dimension in 3-D (PC, MD/Gen, SNES)
 Jinks (C64)
 Katakis/Denaris (Amiga, C64)
 Kubrik (iOS, Wii)
 Leona's Tricky Adventures (AmigaOS, DC, PC)
 L&M Adventure: Sunny shine on the funny side of life (Amiga)
 Madness (C64)
 Mad News (Amiga, PC)
 Master Blazer (Amiga)
 MenaTeus (PC)
 M.U.D.S. – Mean Ugly Dirty Sport (Amiga, PC)
 NUREN: The New Reinassance (Oculus, PC)
 Oxxonian (Amiga, C64)
 Planet of War (C64)
 P.T.C. (Amiga)
 Quik and Silva (Amiga)
 R-Type (Amiga, C64, iOS) (intro music)
 Rock 'n Roll (Amiga)
 Runsters on the run! (Android, Browser, iOS)
 Seawasp (Android)
 Sky Fighter (Amiga, Atari ST)
 StarBall (Amiga, C64) (intro music)
 Star Wars Episode I: Battle for Naboo (N64, PC)
 Star Wars: Rogue Squadron (N64, PC)
 Star Wars Rogue Squadron II: Rogue Leader (GC)
 Star Wars Rogue Squadron III: Rebel Strike (GC)
 Shades (C64 demo)
 Space Rat Xplode! (MacOS, PC)
 Star Trek: Infinite Space (Browser) (unreleased)
 Story Hour: Adventures (Wii)
 Story Hour: Fairy Tales (Wii)
 SubSolar (iOS)
 Tiny Thor (PC)
 To be on top (C64)
 Tunnel B1 (PC, PS1, Saturn)
 Turrican (Amiga)
 Turrican II: The Final Fight (Amiga)
 Mega Turrican/Turrican 3: Payment Day (Amiga, MD/Gen)
 Super Turrican (SNES)
 Super Turrican 2 (SNES)
 Typherra: Colonial Patrol (PC) (unreleased)
 The War of the Worlds (PC, PS3, X360)
 X: Beyond the Frontier (PC)
 X-Out (Amiga)
 Z-Out (Amiga)
 ZombieSmash! (iOS)

</ref>

Additional work
 Ball Blazer Champions (PS1) (SFX)
 B.C. Kid (Amiga) (Sound Support)
 DeathTrap (Amiga) (SFX)
 Emergency: Fighters for Life (PC) (SFX)
 HB Race Game (Amiga) (Music conversion)
 Indiana Jones' Greatest Adventures (MD/Gen) (unreleased) (Additional conversions)
 Indiana Jones and the Infernal Machine (N64) (Music conversion)
 International Superstar Soccer Deluxe (MD/Gen) (Music / SFX conversion)
 Jaguar XJ220 (SNES) (unreleased)  (Music conversion)
 Journey to the center of the earth (C64) (SFX)
 Lair (PS3) (Music editing / Voice line editing / Implementation)
 Perry Rhodan: Operation Eastside (PC) (SFX)
 Resident Evil 2 (N64) (Music conversion)
 Targa (SNES) (unreleased) (Additional Sounds)
 The Secret of Monkey Island'' (Music conversion)

References

External links

 
 Artist profile at OverClocked ReMix
 ElectronicScene.com profile
 

1968 births
German composers
German male composers
Living people
Commodore 64 music
Amiga people
Tracker musicians
Musicians from Kassel
Video game composers